PGP Virtual Disk is a disk encryption system that allows one to create a virtual encrypted disk within a file.

Older versions for Windows NT were freeware (for example, bundled with PGP v6.0.2i; and with some of the CKT builds of PGP). These are still available for download, but no longer maintained. Today, PGP Virtual Disk is available as part of the PGP Desktop product family, running on Windows 2000/XP/Vista, and Mac OS X.

See also
 Disk encryption software
  Comparison of disk encryption software
 United States v. Boucher – federal criminal case involving PGPDisk-protected data

Cryptographic software
Disk encryption